The 2021 Magyar Kupa Final was the final match of the 2019–20 Magyar Kupa, played between Budapesti Honvéd and Mezőkövesd on 3 June 2020 at the Puskás Aréna in Budapest, Hungary.

Match

Details
</onlyinclude>

Notes

References

External links
 Official site 

2020
Budapest Honvéd FC matches